Strathalbyn is a town in South Australia, in the Alexandrina Council. As of 2016, the town had a population of approximately 6,500.

Location
Strathalbyn is 60 km southeast of Adelaide on the banks of the River Angas, at the southeastern edge of the Adelaide Hills and beginning of the Fleurieu Peninsula.

The Children's Bridge is a pedestrian bridge over the river in the park.

Climate
Strathalbyn has a warm-summer mediterranean climate (Köppen climate classification: Csb).

History

Aboriginal Australian people are indigenous to the area in which Strathalbyn is now located.  Among them were tribes which are now commonly described as the Ngarrindjeri people, a generic ethnonym popularised by English missionary George Taplin for the various, distinct groups of people who occupied much of the Fleurieu Peninsula, lower Murray River and Coorong regions prior to and after colonisation.

The town itself was founded in 1839, the first landholders being Dr. Rankine, followed by Donald McLean.

In 1846 the cadastral division, the Hundred of Strathalbyn, was proclaimed including the township of Strathalbyn at the south-western corner of the division.

Strathalbyn was once a major stop on the route from Adelaide to Melbourne.

The streets were laid out in a broad and liberal manner, with a large area reserved on either side of the River Angas for recreation purposes, plus a site for a Presbyterian Church and cemetery. The community was soon the centre for a large pastoral and farming population, many of Scottish origin. Mining later became important in the area.

The District Council of Strathalbyn was established in 1854. In 1868 a municipal council, the Corporation of Strathalbyn, was formed by secession of section 2600 of the Hundred of Strathalbyn from the district council. The town and district councils later re-amalgamated in 1976.

Strathalbyn was connected by broad gauge horse tram to Goolwa and Victor Harbor from 1869. The Victor Harbor railway line was extended to Mount Barker and Adelaide and upgraded for steam engines from 1884. It was isolated again in 1995 when the Adelaide-Melbourne railway line was converted to standard gauge. The SteamRanger historic tourist train runs on the isolated broad gauge line, including stops at Strathalbyn.

Heritage List

The Strathalbyn Post Office was entered in the Commonwealth Heritage List in 2004. The Strathalbyn Post Office, constructed in 1911–1912, is historically important for its association with the development of the township of Strathalbyn. It is an example of an Edwardian Baroque and Arts and Crafts hybrid applied to a public building in the 'Commonwealth' style.

Industry

Mining
Small lead, zinc, gold and copper mines operated in the area in the later part of the 19th century, but these have all been long closed, and did not have a significant effect on the development of the town.

In 2008, mining company Terramin Australia Ltd established an underground zinc mine with the decline portal and much of the above-ground operation situated in a quarry east of the town, injecting an estimated $29 million into the local economy and creating around 100 jobs. The mine was expected to yield zinc and lead, with small quantities of silver, gold and copper, and operate for seven years. This proposal was opposed by "The Residents for a Future Strathalbyn Inc." who were concerned about ecologically unsustainable development within their district.
 The mine stopped operating in October 2013 due to low metal prices and the economic ore reserve running out. The closure resulted in over 100 jobs being lost to the town. It is possible that the zinc mine will reopen to extract more ore if the sale price increases. A 5MW/10MWh Compressed air energy storage demonstration project is scheduled for the mine.

Culture
Strathalbyn has four pubs on the centre of town, The Victoria, The Robin Hood, The Terminus, and the Commercial.  It is also host to an annual collectors, hobbies and antique fair, held the third weekend of August every year. Other popular events are the Strathalbyn Rotary Club's renowned Duck Race, the Strathalbyn Show, and the collaborative Street Parade and Carols by Candlelight. There is also a Sunday market, once per month, at the railway station.

In 1975, street scenes from the film Picnic at Hanging Rock were filmed in the town.

Antiques 
Strathalbyn is recognized internationally for its main street full of antique shops with London House being one of the most historic. Andrew Douglas Ambrose Murrell, b. 22 July 1945 was a prominent South Australian art and antiques dealer operating out of the well-known London House in the 1980s who later went on to become an oil painter.

References

Towns in South Australia